Kocakoç is a village in the Tunceli District, Tunceli Province, Turkey. The village is populated by Kurds of the Alan tribe and had a population of 211 in 2021.

The hamlets of Alikahraman, Ballı, Boylu, Güllüce, İbiş, Kale, Karataş, Kayacık, Seyitbey, Tatlıca, Yağlıca, Yapraklı, Yıldızlı and Yürücek are attached to the village.

References 

Villages in Tunceli District
Kurdish settlements in Tunceli Province